Koshcheyevo is a rural locality (a village) in Golovinskoye Rural Settlement, Sudogodsky District, Vladimir Oblast, Russia. The population was 18 as of 2010.

Geography 
Koshcheyevo is located 22 km west of Sudogda (the district's administrative centre) by road. Chernigovka is the nearest rural locality.

References 

Rural localities in Sudogodsky District